The Intercultural Museum (Interkulturelt Museum) is located at Tøyenbekken 5  in Oslo, Norway.  
The Intercultural Museum is a migration museum, and is primarily concerned with the collection, preservation and dissemination of Norwegian immigration history.
Since 2006, the Intercultural Museum has been part of the Oslo Museum.

Intercultural Museum  was founded in 1990 by Bente Guro Møller who was head  of the museum until 2007. 
Mass immigration is a relatively recent phenomenon in Norway, starting with the influx of Pakistani migrant workers in the 1970s. The Intercultural Museum was established as a response to the immigration and the cultural changes it entailed. It has received much attention for its pioneer work with the new minority groups in Norway. In 2006, it was selected as "Museum of the Year" by the Norwegian Museums Association.

The museum is open daily (except Mondays), and offers free entry to the main exhibits and the gallery of contemporary art. It also offers guided tours around Grønland, the historical "transit area" in downtown Oslo and one of the most obviously multicultural districts in the city.

References

Further reading 
 Møller, B. G., & Einarsen, H. P. (2008). "As in a Mirror". In K. Goodknow & H. Akman, eds., Scandinavian Museums and Cultural Diversity. Oxford: Museum of London and Berghahn Books. pp. 140–45.
 Naguib, S.-A. (2013a). "La politique de la diversité dans un musée sans collection, l'Interkulturelt Museum d'Oslo". In D. Chevallier, ed., Métamorphoses des musées de société. Paris: La Documentation française. pp. 105–110.
 Naguib, S.-A. (2013b). "Museums, Diasporas and the Sustainability of Intangible Cultural Heritage". Sustainability 2013 (5), 2178–90.
 Varutti, M. (2011). "Gradients of Alterity: Museums and the Negotiation of Cultural Difference in Contemporary Norway".  Arv - Nordic Yearbook of Folklore 67, 13–36.
 Öscan, G., ed. (2015). Norvegiska Romá – Norwegian Gypsies: One People – Many Voices. Oslo: Oslo Museum.

External links 
Oslo Museum

Museums in Oslo
Interculturalism
Museums established in 1990